1915 Quetzálcoatl, provisional designation , is a very eccentric, stony asteroid classified as near-Earth object, about half a kilometer in diameter. It was discovered on 9 March 1953, by American astronomer Albert George Wilson at Palomar Observatory, California. It was named for Quetzalcoatl from Aztec mythology.

Orbit and classification 

Quetzálcoatl is an Amor asteroid – a subgroup of near-Earth asteroids that approach the orbit of Earth from beyond, but do not cross it – and a member of the Alinda family of highly eccentric asteroids. It orbits the Sun at a distance of 1.1–4.0 AU with a period of around 4 years. The osculating orbit as of 2017 has a period just over 4 years, but the period varies because Quetzálcoatl is near the 3:1 orbital resonance with Jupiter (and possibly because it is near the 1:4 resonance with Earth). Its orbit has an eccentricity of 0.57 and an inclination of 20° with respect to the ecliptic.

When it was discovered in March 1953 it had a magnitude around 15, but in recent times its magnitude rarely dips below 20 because even when it is near perihelion it is far from Earth. After the 1953 close approach there were others every four years until March 1981, but the next one will not be until 77 years (19 orbits averaging 4,05 years) later, in February 2062, when its magnitude will be about 17. Its magnitude will get to around 16 (a bit less bright than in 1953) 52 years (13 orbits) later in 2114. Another close approach will occur 39 years (10 orbits) later in 2153 (average period 3.9 years). In the 285 years from 1953 to 2238 it makes 72 orbits, giving an average period of 3.96 years (quite close to a third of Jupiter's period, which comes to 3.95 years).

Its Earth Minimum orbit intersection distance (MOID) is 0.1102 AU which translates into 42.9 lunar distances.

Physical characteristics 

In the Tholen classification, Quetzálcoatl is classified as a rare SMU-subtype of the broader S-type asteroids. Its mean-diameter is between 0.4 and 0.5 kilometers. It has a rotation period of 4.9 hours and an albedo of 0.21–0.31. In 1981, this object was observed with radar from the Arecibo Observatory at a distance of 0.09 AU. The measured radar cross-section was 0.02 km2.

Naming 

This minor planet is named after the "feathered serpent" Quetzalcoatl, the Mesoamerican deity of wisdom and culture who brought learning to the Toltec people. The official  was published by the Minor Planet Center on 1 June 1975.

References

External links 
 Asteroid Lightcurve Database (LCDB), query form (info )
 Dictionary of Minor Planet Names, Google books
 Asteroids and comets rotation curves, CdR – Observatoire de Genève, Raoul Behrend
 
 
 

001915
001915
Discoveries by Albert George Wilson
Named minor planets
001915
001915
19530309